Der grosse Sommer is a Swiss-German language film that was released in Switzerland on 28 January 2016. Produced partly in Japan, it is the last film starring Mathias Gnädinger.

Cast 
 Mathias Gnädinger as Anton Sommer
 Gilles Schyvens-Gnädinger,  as young Sommer
 Loïc Sho Güntensperger, as Hiro Akima
 Reto Stalder, as Hofer
 Monica Gubser
 Sonja Riesen
 Hanspeter Müller-Drossaart
 Mitsuko Baisho
 Tomio Suga

Plot (excerpt) 
Anton Sommer (Mathias Gnädinger) is retired and lives quietly in the countryside. Once a popular Swiss wrestler, Sommer now tinkers with his bottle ships and wants to be left alone. However, Hiro (Loïc Sho Güntensperger) does not respect Sommer's seclusive live. When Hiro's grandmother, the owner of Sommer's apartment, unexpectedly dies, the boy asks Sommer to accompany him to the south of Japan where Hiro intends to attend a school for Sumo wrestlers. Sommer does not intend to fulfill Hiro's wish, concluded with his past. But the little boy is just as stubborn as Sommer; after Hiro threatens him with terminating his lease, the old man fulfills the boy's wish. Sommer leaves Switzerland for the first time in his life, and the two travel to Japan to start developing a strong friendship.

Title 
The title of the film refers to the German surname Sommer, and to the German word for "summer". The term gross (meaning "tall") refers to the protagonist's stature, and also to "great".

Production 

Mathias Gnädinger died on 3 April 2015, but the filming in Switzerland and Japan was finished in autumn 2014, thus as of April 2015 the post production works not yet finished. Tellfilm decided to release the film in (late) summer 2015 instead of 2016 as planned and again re-scheduled. The film was released in Switzerland on 28 January 2016. The script bases on two intense research trips to Japan. The production is supported by the Swiss Federal Office of Culture, the Zürich Film Foundation and the so-called Migros Kulturprozent.

The production works in Japan were documented by 10vor10, and Gnädiger was absolutely fascinated by the old Japanese tradition, and his ten-year-old co-star Loïc Sho of Swiss-Japanese origin. Gnädinger was told to get in touch with the Swiss wrestling (Schwingen) just one time as a boy. Ursula Gnädinger assisted her husband at the production works as make-up artist. Gnädinger's son Gilles plays Sommer as a young man.

Festivals 
 2016: Solothurner Filmtage, Solothurn, Switzerland.

Release 
The Swiss comedy premiered on 14 December 2015 in Tokyo, on 23 January at the 2016 Solothurn Film Festival in Europe, and started in the Swiss cinemas on 28 January 2016.

Home media 
The film was released under the title Der grosse Sommer in the DVD format (RC2) on 25 August 2016. The home release includes language versions in German and Swiss German, and subtitles in English, French, Italian, Japanese and German.

References

External links 
  
 

2016 films
Swiss comedy films
Swiss German-language films
2010s comedy road movies
Films set in Japan
Films shot in Japan
Sumo films
2016 comedy films
Japan in non-Japanese culture